Total productive maintenance (TPM) started as a method of physical asset management focused on maintaining and improving manufacturing machinery, in order to reduce the operating cost to an organization. After the PM award was created and awarded to Nippon Denso in 1971, the JIPM (Japanese Institute of Plant Maintenance), expanded it to include 8 pillars of TPM that required involvement from all areas of manufacturing in the concepts of lean Manufacturing.
TPM is designed to disseminate the responsibility for maintenance and machine performance, improving employee engagement and teamwork within management, engineering, maintenance, and operations.

There are eight types of pillars TPM:
 Focused improvements
 JH Pillar (autonomous maintenance) 
 PM pillar (planned maintenance) 
 QM pillar (quality maintenance) 
 DM pillar (development maintenance) 
 E&T pillar (education and training) 
 OTPM (office total productive maintenance, or office TPM) 
 SHE Pillar (safety, health and environment)

History
Total productive maintenance (TPM) was developed by Seiichi Nakajima in Japan between 1950 and 1970.  This experience led to the recognition that a leadership mindset engaging front line teams in small group improvement activity is an essential element of effective operation.  The outcome of his work was the application of the TPM process in 1971.  One of the first companies to gain from this was Nippondenso, a company that created parts for Toyota.  They became the first winner of the PM prize.  An internationally accepted TPM benchmark developed by the JIPM  Seiichi Nakajima is therefore regarded as the father of TPM.  The classic TPM process he developed consisting of 5 principles was later enhanced by the JIPM to incorporate many of the lessons of Lean Manufacturing and is referred to as Company-Wide TPM which consists of 8 principles/pillars.

Objectives 
The goal of TPM is the continuous improvement of equipment effectiveness through engaging those that impact on it in small group improvement activities. Total quality management (TQM) and total productive maintenance (TPM) are considered as the key operational activities of the quality management system. In order for TPM to be effective, the full support of the total workforce is required. This should result in accomplishing the goal of TPM: "Enhance the volume of the production, employee morals, and job satisfaction."

The main objective of TPM is to increase the Overall Equipment Effectiveness (OEE) of plant equipment. TPM addresses the causes for accelerated deterioration and production losses while creating the correct environment between operators and equipment to create ownership.

OEE has three factors which are multiplied to give one measure called OEE
Performance x Availability x Quality = OEE

Each factor has two associated losses making 6 in total, these 6 losses are as follows:

Performance = (1) running at reduced speed – (2) Minor Stops

Availability = (3) Breakdowns – (4) Product changeover

Quality = (5) Startup rejects – (6) Running rejects

The objective finally is to identify then prioritize and eliminate the causes of the losses. This is done by self-managing teams that solve problems. Employing consultants to create this culture is a common practice.

Principles 
The eight pillars of TPM are mostly focused on proactive and preventive techniques for improving equipment reliability:

 Autonomous maintenance - Operators who use all of their senses to help identify causes for losses
 Focused improvement - Scientific approach to problem solving to eliminate losses from the factory
 Planned maintenance - Professional maintenance activities performed by trained mechanics and engineers
 Quality maintenance - Scientific and statistical approach to identifying defects and eliminating the cause of them
 Early/equipment management  - Scientific introduction of equipment and design concepts that eliminate losses and make it easier to make defect free production efficiently.
 Education and training - Support to continuous improvement of knowledge of all workers and management
 Administrative & office TPM - Using total productive maintenance tools to improve all the support aspects of a manufacturing plant including production scheduling, materials management and information flow, As well as increasing moral of individuals and offering awards to well deserving employees for increasing their morals.
 Safety health environmental conditions 

With the help of these pillars, we can increase productivity.
Manufacturing support.

Implementation 
Following are the steps involved by the implementation of TPM in an organization:

 Initial evaluation of TPM level,
 Introductory Education and Propaganda (IEP) for TPM,
 Formation of TPM committee,
 Development of a master plan for TPM implementation,
 Stage by stage training to the employees and stakeholders on all eight pillars of TPM,
 Implementation preparation process,
 Establishing the TPM policies and goals and development of a road map for TPM implementation.

According to Nicholas, the steering committee should consist of production managers, maintenance managers, and engineering managers. The committee should formulate TPM policies and strategies and give advice. This committee should be led by a top-level executive. Also a TPM program team must rise, this program team has oversight and coordination of implementation activities. As well, it's lacking some crucial activities, like starting with partial implementation. Choose the first target area as a pilot area, this area will demonstrate the TPM concepts. Lessons learned from early target areas/the pilot area can be applied further in the implementation process.

Difference from TQM 
Total quality management and total productive maintenance are often used interchangeably. However, TQM and TPM share a lot of similarities but are considered as two different approaches in the official literature. TQM attempts to increase the quality of goods, services, and concomitant customer satisfaction by raising awareness of quality concerns across the organization.

TQM is based on five cornerstones: The product, the process that allows the product to be produced, the organization that provides the proper environment needed for the process to work, the leadership that guides the organization, and commitment to excellence throughout the organization.

In other words, TQM focuses on the quality of the product, while TPM focuses on the losses that impede the equipment used to produce the products. By preventing equipment break-down, improving the quality of the equipment and by standardizing the equipment (results in less variance, so better quality), the quality of the products increases. TQM and TPM can both result in an increase in quality. However, the way of going there is different. TPM can be seen as a way to help to achieve the goal of TQM.

References 

Business terms
Business process management